Tricia Guild OBE (born 1946) is a British designer and the founder and Creative Director of Designers Guild an international home and lifestyle company with a store and showroom on the Kings Road and Marylebone High Street in London, and offices in London with showrooms in Paris, Munich, Stockholm and New York.

Tricia Guild is known for her fabric and wallpaper collections and her work as a designer and manufacturer on a range of home interior products.

Career

Tricia Guild established Designers Guild, in 1970 whilst searching for textiles to decorate with. By re-colouring a collection of Indian hand-block printed textiles, the first collection was established. She opened her store on the Kings Road with her first collection of fabrics, also selling ceramics and furniture. In 1974 she started working with artists such as Kaffe Fassett, Lillian Delevoryas and Janice Tchalenko, among others.

Throughout the 1990s Guild focused her attention on expanding the range as Designers Guild grew in the UK and overseas. The flagship store and showroom are situated on the Kings Road, London and include a showroom devoted entirely to fabrics, wall coverings, furniture and paint.

In 1985 DG turnover was £3.0m and in 2010 it had grown to over £50m with over 250 staff and offices and showrooms in London, Paris, Munich, Milan and New York.

Guild was appointed an OBE for services to interior design.

Background

Guild has degrees from the Royal College of Art, Winchester School of Art and Loughborough University. She is married with a daughter and a granddaughter, and lives with her husband, the restaurateur Richard Polo, in Notting Hill.

Achievements and awards

 1989 Textile Institute Gold Medal for her outstanding contribution to International Textiles, UK.
 1991 Queen's Award for Export Achievement
 1992 The Export Award for Smaller Businesses.
 1993 Honorary Fellowship from the Royal College of Art, London, UK.
 1993 Honorary Master of Arts Degree from Winchester School of Art, UK.
 1994 A winner of the European Community Design Prize.
 1995 'Excellence de la Maison' for Bedlinen, by Marie Claire Maison Magazine, France.
 1996 Queens Award for Export Achievement (Second time to be awarded)
 1999 Honorary Degree of Doctor of Technology, Loughborough University.
 2007 The Homes & Gardens Classic Design Award – Lifetime achievement.
 2008 Tricia Guild appointed an OBE for services to interior design.

Books

1982   Soft Furnishings
1986   Designing with Flowers
1988   Design and Detail
1989   Design and Garden
1990   Tricia Guild New Soft Furnishing
1992   Tricia Guild on Colour
1994   Tricia Guild’s Painted Country
1996   Tricia Guild in Town
1998   Cut Flowers
1999   White Hot
2002   Think Pink
2004   Private View 
2006   Pattern2008   Flower Sense2010   A Certain Style''
2013    'Colour Deconstructed'

References

External links
Designers Guild Website
Profile in New Statesman
Tricia Guild Interview

1946 births
Living people
British designers
Officers of the Order of the British Empire